San Benito is a municipality in the El Petén department of Guatemala. It covers an area of 112 km2, and had 29,926 inhabitants at the 2002 Census; the latest official estimate (as at mid 2012) was 59,486 people.

It is located adjacent to departmental capital Flores.

Sports
Deportivo San Benito football club have been playing in the second tier of Guatemalan football since they clinched promotion from the third tier after the 1998/1999 season. They play their home games in the Estadio Alejandro Ochaeta Requena.
Deportivo Don Bosco football club have been playing in the third tier of Guatemalan football since 2015/2016 season. They play their home games in the Estadio Alejandro Ochaeta Requena.

References

Missione Petèn (http://missionepeten.altervista.org)

Municipalities of the Petén Department